Pure and Simple is the ninth studio album by Joan Jett and the Blackhearts, released in 1994. The album includes several tracks co-written with Kathleen Hanna, including "Go Home", a response to the murder of Mia Zapata.

Pure and Simple was the first album to feature a new line up of Blackheart band members since the departure of longtime guitarist Ricky Byrd and bassist Kasim Sulton after the release of Jett's last album, Notorious. This new line up consisted of bassist Kenny Aaronson and lead guitarist Tony "Bruno" Rey. Pure and Simple would be the last Joan Jett & the Blackhearts release until 2006's Sinner. In 1995, both Aaronson and Rey went on to other projects. Aaronson would eventually become a member of the reunited New York Dolls – coincidentally taking over for bassist Sami Yaffa, his replacement in the Blackhearts and Rey became the musical director for Enrique Iglesias and Rihanna.

The CD and other versions feature collaborations with performers from Riot Grrrl and Riot Grrrl-associated bands. On all editions, songs "Go Home", "Spinster", "Activity Girl", and "You Got a Problem" were written with Kathleen Hanna (Bikini Kill, The Julie Ruin, Le Tigre); on the vinyl release "Here to Stay" was written with Kat Bjelland (Babes in Toyland); on the Japanese edition "Hostility" was written with Donita Sparks (L7).

"World of Denial" was also added to the Japanese pressings. The Japanese cover differs from the regular cover. "Get Off the Cross" was also recorded during these sessions. Concurrently released in the US on vinyl LP, CD, and cassette, all versions varying slightly. The record album came with a hype sticker that read "All Rock. No Ballads", and omits both "As I Am" and "Brighter Day". A few seconds of the song are also heard on the cassette at the very end of side one before fading out. Jett independently put out "Spinster" as a 7-inch blue vinyl single in the US with a picture sleeve. The B-sides were "Go Home" and "Hostility". The track "World of Denial" was eventually released in the US on Jett's greatest hits album Fit to Be Tied.

Track listing

Personnel

The Blackhearts
Joan Jett - guitars, lead vocals, producer on "Hostility"
Tony "Bruno" Rey - lead guitars
Kenny Aaronson - bass
Thommy Price - drums

Additional musicians
Ricky Byrd, John Marshall, Billy Karren
Blake Brocksmith - harmonica on "Go Home" and "As I Am"
Mike Howe, Kathleen Hanna - vocals
Chuck Kentis - keyboards
Arno Hecht - saxophone

Production
Kenny Laguna - producer on all tracks
Thom Panunzio - producer on tracks 1, 2, 4, 7, 9, 10 and bonus tracks, engineer, mixing
Ed Stasium - producer on tracks 1 and 8
Jim Vallance - producer on tracks 2 and 4
Desmond Child - producer on tracks 6, 11 and 12
John Aiosa - engineer, digital editing
Lance Clark - digital editing
Carl Glanville, Lee Anthony, Tim Donovan, Mike Thompson, Neil Perry, Danny Kadar, Adam Kasper, Delwyn Brooks, Chuck Johnson - assistant engineers
Bob Ludwig - mastering at Gateway Studios, Portland, Maine

Album Design-Spencer Drate, Judith Salavetz
Art Direction-Meryl Laguna
Photography-George Holz

References

Joan Jett albums
1994 albums
Warner Records albums
Blackheart Records albums
Albums produced by Thom Panunzio
Albums produced by Desmond Child
Albums produced by Ed Stasium